Gabriel Hogan (born 17 May 1973) is a Canadian-born American actor. He is best known for his continuing role on the hit cable television firefighter comedy series Tacoma FD, CBC/Up TV/Netflix’s Heartland and the drama Condor.

Background
Hogan was born in Toronto, Ontario and raised in the Yorkville neighbourhood. He is the second of four children. His parents, Michael and Susan Hogan, along with his sister, are also actors.

He is married to actress Inga Cadranel; they have one son, Ryder.

Career

Hogan is best known for his continuing roles on hit series Heartland, Tacoma FD and Condor. He also appeared in Head in the clouds, and as Rolie Cray in the pilot episode of FlashPoint.

Television
Hogan's highest profile roles to date have been in television. He is featured as Peter Morris on the western ranch show  Heartland, and also Ike Crystal in the HBOMAX Comedy Tacoma FD.

His other television credits include the series Prince of Peoria, Condor, Playmakers, Angela's Eyes, Rent-A-Goalie, This Is Wonderland, Heartland, Peter Benchley's Amazon and Robson Arms.

Hogan is an ice hockey fan and proficient player, and several of his credits are hockey related; in 2006, he was part of a documentary-style miniseries about hockey in Canada, called Canada Russia '72. His notable American television credits include a short stint on the acclaimed show Wonderfalls in 2004, playing a lovesick delivery man in two episodes of the short-lived show.
 
He was cast to play Roland "Rolie" Cray on Flashpoint in 2008, but Hogan decided to leave the show after the pilot episode. Sam Braddock (played by David Paetkau) took his spot on the SRU team.

Hogan also played the role of Joseph P. Kennedy Jr. in the 2011 miniseries The Kennedys, and played the lead male role of "Ken Stoddard" in the Hallmark movie Christmas Song in 2012, Then 2 others for Hallmark Channel, in 2014 Christmas at Cartwright's and Christmas List in 2017.

In 2011 and 2012, he also appeared in both seasons of the Canadian police series King as Jessica King's husband and fellow cop Danny Sless.

In 2015, Hogan played a Chimera named Belasko in the Season 5 premiere of MTV's cult television show Teen Wolf, but was killed off by the end of the episode. In 2016, he also appeared in the twelfth episode of the first season of Lady Dynamite. He has also had recurring roles in shows such as Warehouse 13, The Border and The Best Years.

Video games 
 Dino Crisis 2 (2000) (voice)... Dylan Morton

Other credits
Hogan's film credits include Canada Russia '72, Blue City Slammers, and Moving Day.

Filmography

References

External links
 

1973 births
Living people
Canadian male film actors
Canadian male television actors
Canadian male video game actors
Canadian male voice actors
Male actors from Toronto
Canadian people of Irish descent
20th-century Canadian male actors
21st-century Canadian male actors